The Wurundjeri people are an Australian Aboriginal people of the Woiwurrung language group, in the Kulin nation. They are the traditional owners of the Yarra River Valley, covering much of the present location of Melbourne. They continue to live in this area and throughout Australia. They were called the Yarra tribe by early European colonists.

The Wurundjeri Tribe Land and Compensation Cultural Heritage Council was established in 1985 by Wurundjeri people.

Ethnonym
According to the early Australian ethnographer Alfred William Howitt, the name Wurundjeri, in his transcription Urunjeri, refers to a species of eucalypt, Eucalyptus viminalis, otherwise known as the manna or white gum, which is common along the Yarra River. Some modern reports of Wurundjeri traditional lore state that their ethnonym combines a word, wurun, meaning Manna gum and djeri, a species of grub found in the tree, and take the word therefore to mean "Witchetty Grub People".

Language

Wurundjeri people speak Woiwurrung, a dialect of Kulin. Kulin is spoken by the five groups in the Kulin nation.

Clans 
There are several distinct clans of Wurundjeri people with different territories:

Wurundjeri balluk: Their territory covers the area from Mount Baw Baw to Healesville and the northern tributaries of the Yarra River, to the eastern side of the Maribyrnong River and up to Gisborne.

Wurundjeri Willum: Their territory includes the site of Melbourne, up to the east side of the Maribyrnong River and its western branch and along to Mount Macedon. It also includes the western half of country from the Plenty River to the Maribrynong River. Their name comes from wilam meaning 'camp/shelter'.

Marin balluk: From the western side of the Maribyrnong River, centred around Sunbury and the watersheds of Mount Macedon. Their name means "Maribrynong River".

Gunung Willum balluk: from the adjoining Wurundjeri country on the west side of Mount Macedon through to Bullengarook and Daylesford. Their name means "river shelter swamp".

Balluk Willum: from the Cranbourne area. Their name means "swamp shelters" and refers to the swamp that occupied the area before it was drained by colonists.

Ngaruk Willum: from the south side of the Dandenong Ranges.

Kurung Jang baluk: from the Melton area. Their name comes from gurrong (canoe) and baluk (swamp).

Country

These took in the areas of the Yarra and Saltwater rivers around Melbourne, and ran north as far as Mount Disappointment, northwest to Macedon, Woodend, and Lancefield. Their eastern borders went as far as Mount Baw Baw and Healesville. Their southern confines approached Mordialloc, Warragul, and Moe.

The Wurundjeri-balluk and Wurundjeri-willam people occupied the area from the Yarra Valley/Yarra River catchment area to Heidelberg.

In June 2021, the boundaries between the land of two of the traditional owner groups in greater Melbourne, the Wurundjeri and Boonwurrung, were agreed between the two groups, after being drawn up by the Victorian Aboriginal Heritage Council. The new borderline runs across the city from west to east, with the CBD, Richmond and Hawthorn included in Wurundjeri land, and Albert Park, St Kilda and Caulfield on Bunurong land. It was agreed that Mount Cottrell, the site of a massacre in 1836 with at least 10 Wathaurong victims, would be jointly managed above the  line. The two Registered Aboriginal Parties representing the two groups were the Bunurong Land Council Aboriginal Corporation and the Wurundjeri Woi Wurrung Cultural Heritage Aboriginal Corporation. However, these borders are still in dispute among several prominent figures and Wurundjeri territory has been claimed to spread much further west and south.

History

The earliest European settlers came across a park-like landscape extending inland from Melbourne, consisting of large areas of grassy plains to the north and southwest, with little forest cover, something thought to be testimony of indigenous sheet burning practices to expose the massive number of yam daisies which proliferated in the area. These roots and various tuber lilies formed a major source of starch and carbohydrates. Seasonal changes in the weather, availability of foods and other factors would determine where campsites were located, many near the Birrarung and its tributaries.

The Wurundjeri and Gunung Willam Balug clans mined diorite at Mount William stone axe quarry which was a source of the highly valued greenstone hatchet heads, which were traded across a wide area as far as New South Wales and Adelaide. The mine provided a complex network of trading for economic and social exchange among the different Aboriginal nations in Victoria. The quarry had been in use for more than 1,500 years and covered 18 hectares including underground pits of several metres. In February 2008 the site was placed on the Australian National Heritage List for its cultural importance and archeological value.

Settlement and dispossession of the Wurundjeri lands began soon after a ceremony in which Wurundjeri leaders conducted a tanderrum ceremony, whose function was to allow outsiders temporary access to the resources of clan lands. John Batman and other whites interpreted this symbolic act, recorded in treaty form, as equivalent to medieval enfeoffment of all Woiwurrong territory. Within a few years settlement began around Pound Bend with Major Charles Newman at Mullum Mullum Creek in 1838, and James Anderson on Beal Yallock, now known as Anderson's Creek a year later. Their measures to clear the area of aborigines was met with guerrilla skirmishing, led by Jaga Jaga, with the appropriation of cattle and the burning of fields. They were armed with rifles, and esteemed to be excellent marksmen, firing close to Anderson to drive him off as they helped themselves to his potato crop while en route to Yering in 1840. A trap set there by Captain Henry Gibson led to Jaga Jaga's capture and a battle as the Wurundjeri fought unsuccessfully to secure his release. Resistance was broken, and settlements throve. One elder, Derrimut, later stated:
You see…all this mine. All along here Derrimut's once. No matter now, me soon tumble down…Why me have no lubra? Why me have no piccaninny? You have all this place. No good have children, no good have lubra. Me tumble down and die very soon now.

Coranderrk

In 1863 the surviving members of the Wurundjeri tribe were given "permissive occupancy" of Coranderrk Station, near Healesville and forcibly resettled. Despite numerous petitions, letters, and delegations to the Colonial and Federal Government, the grant of this land in compensation for the country lost was refused. Coranderrk was closed in 1924 and its occupants bar five refusing to leave Country were again moved to Lake Tyers in Gippsland.

Wurundjeri today
All remaining Wurundjeri people are descendants of Bebejan, through his daughter Annie Borate (Boorat), and in turn, her son Robert Wandin (Wandoon). Bebejan was a Ngurungaeta of the Wurundjeri people and was present at John Batman's "treaty" signing in 1835. Joy Murphy Wandin, a Wurundjeri elder, explains the importance of preserving Wurundjeri culture:

In the recent past, Wurundjeri culture was undermined by people being forbidden to "talk culture" and language. Another loss was the loss of children taken from families. Now, some knowledge of the past must be found and collected from documents. By finding and doing this, Wurundjeri will bring their past to the present and recreate a place of belonging. A "keeping place" should be to keep things for future generations of our people, not a showcase for all, not a resource to earn dollars. I work towards maintaining the Wurundjeri culture for Wurundjeri people into the future.

In 1985, the Wurundjeri Tribe Land Compensation and Cultural Heritage Council was established to fulfil statutory roles under Commonwealth and Victorian legislation and to assist in raising awareness of Wurundjeri culture and history within the wider community.

Wurundjeri elders often attend events with visitors present where they give the traditional welcome to country greeting in the Woiwurrung language:

which means, "Welcome to the land of the Wurundjeri people".

Notable people

:
 Bebejan (?-1836): , and William Barak's father and Billibellary's brother
 Billibellary (1799–1846):  of the Wurundjeri-willam clan.
 Simon Wonga (1824–1874):  by 1851 until his death. Billibellary's son.
 William Barak (1824–1903):  of the Wurundjeri-willam clan from 1874 until his death.
 James Wandin (1933–2006):  until his death, and an Australian rules footballer
 Murrundindi:  from 2006 until present

Other notable Wurundjeri people include:
 Tullamareena: present during the founding of Melbourne
 Derrimut (1810–1864): a Bunurong elder associated with the Woiwurrung, present during British invasion
 Diane Kerr: elder
 Winnie Quagliotti (1931–1988): elder
 Joy Murphy Wandin: senior elder

Alternative names/spellings

 Coraloon (?)
 Gungung-willam
 Kukuruk (northern clan name)
 Mort Noular (language name)
 Ngarukwillam
 N'uther Galla
 Nuthergalla (ngatha = juða "no" in the Melbourne dialect).
 Oorongie
 Urunjeri
 Waarengbadawa
 Wainworra
 Wairwaioo
 Warerong
 Warorong
 Warwaroo
 Wavoorong
 Wawoorong, Wawoorong
 Wawurong
 Wawurrong
 Woeworung
 Woiworung (name for the language they spoke, from woi + worung = speech)
 Woiwurru (woi = no + wur:u = lip)
 Woiwurung, Woiwurong, Woiwurrong
 Wooeewoorong
 Wowerong
 Wurrundyirra-baluk
 Wurunjeri
 Wurunjerri
 Wurunjerri-baluk
 Yarra Yarra
 Yarra Yarra Coolies (kulin = man)

See also

 Wurundjeri Tribe Land Compensation and Cultural Heritage Council
 Batman's Treaty
 Indigenous Australians
 Australian Aboriginal enumeration
 Battle of Yering
 Possum-skin cloak
 Bunurong
 Gunai people

Notes

Citations

Sources

 cited in 

 
Aboriginal peoples of Victoria (Australia)
History of Melbourne